Gonoda is a rural locality (a selo) in Gunibsky District, Republic of Dagestan, Russia. The population was 1,417 as of 2010. There are 3 streets.

Geography 
Gonoda is located 49 km northwest of Gunib (the district's administrative centre) by road. Gogotl and Teletl are the nearest rural localities.

References 

Rural localities in Gunibsky District